Oxendon was a rural district in Northamptonshire, England from 1894 to 1935.

It was formed under the Local Government Act 1894 from the part of the Market Harborough rural sanitary district which was in Northamptonshire (the rest going on to form Market Harborough Rural District in Leicestershire).  It was named after Great Oxendon.

The rural district contained 19 civil parishes:
 Arthingworth
 Ashley
 Brampton Ash
 Braybrooke
 Clipston
 Dingley
 East Farndon
 Great Oxendon
 Hothorpe
 Kelmarsh
 Marston Trussell
 Sibbertoft
 Stoke Albany
 Sulby
 Sutton Bassett
 Thorpe Lubenham
 Welford
 Weston by Welland
 Wilbarston

The district was abolished in 1935 under a County Review Order.  It was split between Brixworth Rural District and Kettering Rural District.

References
http://www.visionofbritain.org.uk/relationships.jsp?u_id=10093284

History of Northamptonshire
Local government in Northamptonshire
Districts of England created by the Local Government Act 1894
Rural districts of England